Vulnerability index may refer to:

 Vulnerability index, a generic concept developed in the Small Developing Islands program and extended to medical and environmental planning
 Economic Vulnerability Index, introduced by the United Nations Committee for Development Policy
 Environmental Vulnerability Index, a measurement devised by the South Pacific Applied Geoscience Commission of the United Nations Environment Program and others
 Homeless Vulnerability Index, a means for identifying and prioritizing the street homeless population for housing according to the fragility of their health

See also 

Biotic index, a simple measurement of stream pollution and its effects on the biology of the stream
 Climate Vulnerability Monitor, which attempts to demonstrate how each country is vulnerable to climate change
Environmental Performance Index
Environmental Sustainability Index
Pandemic severity index
Social vulnerability
Vulnerability assessment
 Vulnerability in computing